Charlie Hugall (born 1984) is a British music producer, songwriter and mix engineer. He has produced and mixed records for Florence and the Machine, Ed Sheeran, Halsey, Swim Deep, Kaiser Chiefs, Lucy Rose, Crystal Fighters and others.

Career
He learnt the craft of sound engineering at The Dairy Studios in Brixton, where he first came to prominence with Florence + the Machine's song "You've Got the Love". It spawned a second single featuring Dizzee Rascal "You Got the Dirtee Love".

Charlie also worked with Florence Welch to produce "My Boy Builds Coffins" from her debut album Lungs and to mix and produce the bonus disc on the second album, Ceremonials.

Soon after his work with Florence + the Machine, he began work mixing and adding additional production to Crystal Fighters' – Star of Love, Delilah's – From the Roots Up (which debuted at number #5), in addition to production work for The 2:54, The Maccabees, Alex Winston and the Kaiser Chiefs.

In 2013, Hugall was awarded Breakthrough Engineer of the Year by the Music Producers Guild. That year, he produced Swim Deep's critically acclaimed top 10 album Where the Heaven Are We before working on Dry The River's second album Alarms in the Heart in 2014 and writing and producing Halsey's song "Haunting" off her hit debut album Badlands in 2015.

In response to the Paris bombings, in Dec 2015 he produced and mixed the Florence & The Machine collaboration with The Maccabees honouring the victims of the attacks with a cover of the Eagles of Death Metal's "I Love You All the Time"

Songwriting and production credits

References

British songwriters
1984 births
Living people